Diaugasma is a genus of sea snails, marine gastropod mollusks in the family Raphitomidae.

Description
The minute shell is oliviform, smoother microscopically spirally striolate, mainly on each side of the sutures, leaving the central portion of the whorl plain, in form cylindrical or elongate, compact, only slightly
impressed at the sutures. The whorls of the protoconch are closely and very finely cancellate. The whorls are semi-pellucid, unicolorous white, or flecked with pale stramineous. The aperture is narrowly oblong. The outer lip is nearly straight, slightly thickened,. The sinus is hardly expressed.

Species
Species within the genus Diaugasma include:
 Diaugasma epicharta (Melvill & Standen, 1903)
 Diaugasma olyra (Reeve, 1845)
Species brought into synonymy
 Diaugasma marchadi (Knudsen, 1956): synonym of Kyllinia marchadi (Knudsen, 1956)

References

External links
  Melvill J.C. & Standen R. (1903). Descriptions of sixty-eight new Gastropoda from the Persian Gulf, Gulf of Oman, and North Arabian Sea, dredged by the Indo-European Telegraph Service, 1901–1903. Annals and Magazine of Natural History. ser. 7, 12: 289-324
 Rolán E., Otero-Schmitt J. & Fernandes F. (1998) The family Turridae s. l. (Mollusca, Neogastropoda) in Angola (West Africa). 1. Subfamily Daphnellinae. Iberus, 16: 95–118
 Worldwide Mollusc Species Data Base: Raphitomidae

 
Raphitomidae
Gastropod genera